Auberon Herbert (1838–1906), English philosopher and politician, a son of 3rd Earl of Carnarvon.

Auberon Herbert may also refer to:
 Auberon Herbert, 9th Baron Lucas (1876-1916), politician and fighter pilot, a grandson of 3rd Earl of Carnarvon.
 Auberon Herbert (landowner) (1922-1974), advocate of Eastern European causes after World War II, a grandson of 4th Earl of Carnarvon.